Nightwatch in the Living City is an adventure for the 2nd edition of the Advanced Dungeons & Dragons fantasy role-playing game.

Plot summary
The player characters have ventured to the city of Raven's Bluff with hopes of finding fame and fortune, and have joined the City Guard in their night-watch patrols as a means to that end. Events and encounters follow a sort of flow chart, with several linked episodes leading to a minor climax, with a major-action climax to end the adventure. Narrative frame and DM-control hooks carry the PCs from scene to scene, but within each scene the players and DM are free to explore a variety of approaches in solving conflicts. All the action in the module takes place in a single night in the setting.

Publication history
LC3 Nightwatch in the Living City includes design by Walter M. Baas and Kira Glass with editing by John Nephew, and was published by TSR, Inc. as a 32-page module. Nightwatch in the Living City is based on a tournament adventure originally designed and run through the RPGA Network.

Reception
Ken Rolston reviewed Nightwatch in the Living City for Dragon magazine #171 (July 1991). Rolston calls Nightwatch "a perfect example of how convention design and playtesting can produce a first-class adventure". He calls the adventure challenges "lovely role-playing set pieces", attributing this to the RPGA Network making "a special effort to encourage the role-playing elements of FRP gaming". Rolston states: "Each episode is set up with a colorful entry piece, and the gaming details and anticipated player actions are concisely presented with the sort of solid practical advice that you can get only from well-tested scenarios." He goes on to say that Nightwatch is "all the more remarkable because city role-playing scenarios are notoriously tricky to run. Nightwatch simplifies the DM's task by providing a narrative framework [...] that leads the PCs from one conflict to another so smoothly that they aren't tempted to wander off into the city streets. In particular, the skillful dramatic staging of the PCs' induction to the Nightwatch gets the PCs quickly into character and into the spirit of the adventure."  He comments that the adventure episodes "have plenty of damned-if-you-do, damned-if-you-don't charm that is ever the burden of the public servant" and notes that the encounters "are full of lovely little misdirections and plot twists, with charming and devious NPCs, sweet little children (I know I'm in for a rough night when a DM saddles me with a lovable tyke), peculiar monsters, and plenty of oddball surprises, all seasoned with pathos, humor, and irony. There's relatively little danger of death for low-hit-point characters (the ideal situation for 1st-level beings), but plenty of opportunity exists for humiliation and confusion-the only real terrors of players in an AD&D game universe where even death usually isn't a permanent inconvenience." He felt that Nightwatch "is designed to encourage role-playing and DM improvisation, but Nightwatch provides the necessary rigging and practical "if-this-happens" advice that [adventures such as] Arena of Thyatis and Legions of Thyatis lack". Rolston concluded the review by saying: "This is an inspiring piece of work, perfect to run as is or to use for stealing ideas. A well-rigged narrative structure is given, yet with ample roleplaying and improvisational opportunities for DM and players. Also present is a host of nifty characters to deal with and plot puzzles to solve, featuring numerous sly and surprising variations on conventional AD&D game cliches. Finally, good fun in abundance. I highly recommend this."

References

Dungeons & Dragons modules
Role-playing game supplements introduced in 1991